Rex Perpetuus Norvegiæ (Latin), i.e. Norway's Eternal King) is a term for King Olaf II of Norway, also known as Saint Olaf (Olav den hellige) .

Background
In written sources, the term Perpetuus rex Norvegiæ appears from the second half of the 12th century in Historia Norvegiæ.

Olaf's great-nephew, King Magnus III of Norway and of Mann and the Isles, reportedly was the first king known to use the Norwegian lion in his standard although Snorri Sturluson is the only source for this. The first instance of the lion bearing an axe is found in a seal of King Eric II of Norway (1285). The axe represents Olaf II as 'martyr and saint'.

Gallery

See also
Legendary Saga of St. Olaf
Separate Saga of St. Olaf
The Saint Olav Drama

References

Olaf II of Norway